Mathias Ullereng Kjølø (born 27 June 2001) is a Norwegian professional footballer who plays as a midfielder for Eredivisie club Twente.

He is a son of Mike Kjølø, mainly known for his career with Stabæk.

Club career
Kjølø was born in Oslo and played youth football with Kjelsås until 2016, after which he left for Vålerenga.

PSV
After six months with Vålerenga, he was sent on loan to Dutch Eredivisie club PSV Eindhoven, who then signed him to a permanent deal in 2018. He made his professional football debut for the reserve team Jong PSV in the second-tier Eerste Divisie on 13 January 2020 in a 0–0 draw at home against Jong Ajax. On 16 October 2020, he signed a two-year extension to his contract, keeping him at PSV until the summer of 2023. 

He made his first-team debut for PSV on 8 November 2020 in a 3–0 domestic league win over Willem II, coming on as a substitute for Ibrahim Sangaré in the 88th minute.

Twente
On 8 June 2022, PSV announced that Kjølø had signed a long-term contract to join FC Twente ahead of the 2022–23 season.

International career
Kjølø played for various Norwegian national youth teams between 2017 and 2019. On 12 October 2021, he made his debut for the Norway national under-21 team in a 3–0 win over Estonia as a 78th-minute substitute for Johan Hove.

Career statistics

References

2001 births
Living people
Norwegian footballers
Norway youth international footballers
Norway under-21 international footballers
Norwegian expatriate footballers
Association football midfielders
Eerste Divisie players
Eredivisie players
Kjelsås Fotball players
Vålerenga Fotball players
PSV Eindhoven players
Jong PSV players
FC Twente players
Norwegian expatriate sportspeople in the Netherlands
Expatriate footballers in the Netherlands
Footballers from Oslo